James P. McMullan (October 13, 1936 – May 31, 2019) was an American actor from Long Island, New York, best known for his role as Dr. Terry McDaniel on the 1960s series Ben Casey and as Senator Andrew Dowling on the CBS primetime soap opera Dallas.

McMullan studied Industrial Design at New York University and Parsons School of Design; he graduated from the University of Kansas in 1961 with a Bachelor of Architecture degree.

Career
He went to Hollywood in 1961 to visit a friend and through a chance meeting with playwright William Inge, was given a screen test for Sam Peckinpah's  Ride the High Country (1962) (Peckinpah also directed the screen test). The test was sent to Universal Pictures, which put him under a seven-year contract, the start of a successful 30-year film career. In 1962 McMullan appeared as Jess Kroeger on the TV western The Virginian on the episode titled "Impasse."

McMullan starred as John Moore on the short-lived CBS-TV series Beyond Westworld and as Officer Don Burdick on the series Chopper One.

McMullan co-starred in a number of notable TV series including the Alfred Hitchcock Hour, Dr. Kildare, The Time Tunnel, Hart to Hart, Cannon, S.W.A.T, Barnaby Jones, The Fall Guy, Daniel Boone and Baywatch. He has guest-starred in over 150 TV shows which also include MacGyver, Doogie Howser, M.D., The Six Million Dollar Man, The Rockford Files, The Young and the Restless, The A-Team, and the made for-TV movie The Taking of Flight 847: The Uli Derickson Story (1988).

McMullan's many feature film credits include The Raiders (1963), where he played the part of Buffalo Bill Cody,  Shenandoah (1965), The Happiest Millionaire (1967), Downhill Racer (1969), Pursuit (1972), Extreme Close-Up (1973), The Incredible Shrinking Woman (1981), Assassination (1987), Strategic Command (1997), Austin Powers: International Man of Mystery (1997) and Batman & Robin (1997).

Filmography

The Raiders (1963) – William F. 'Buffalo Bill' Cody
Shenandoah (1965) – John Anderson 
The Happiest Millionaire (1967) – Lt. Powell 
Downhill Racer (1969) – Creech 
The Windsplitter (1971) – Bobby Joe
Pursuit (1972, TV Movie) – Lewis 
Extreme Close-Up (1973) – John Norman 
The Incredible Shrinking Woman (1981) – Lyle Parks
Assassination (1987) – The Zipper
Life Flight: The Movie (1987) – C.J. Reynolds
Judicial Consent (1994) – Trenton Clarkson
Strategic Command (1997) – The President
Austin Powers: International Man of Mystery (1997) – American UN Representative
Batman & Robin (1997) – Party Guest
The Eighteenth Angel (1997) – Priest #4
Shadow of Doubt (1998) – Moderator Pundit
The Extreme Adventures of Super Dave (2000) – Surgeon

References

External links

American male television actors
American male film actors
Male actors from New York (state)
People from Long Island
Place of death missing
People from Long Beach, New York
1936 births
2019 deaths
Neurological disease deaths in California
Deaths from motor neuron disease
20th-century American male actors